Guangdong Foday Automobile Co., Ltd., trading as Foday, is an automotive manufacturing company based in Guangdong, China. With roots going back to 1988, it used to be known as Guangdong Fudi Automobile Co., Ltd.. Its principal products are vehicles, primarily pick-up trucks and SUVs, automotive parts and stampings. Its products have been sold in various countries under the Fudi and Foday brands.

Products
Foday Explorer ll SUV
Foday Explorer III SUV
Foday Landfort SUV
Foday Explorer 6 SUV; launched October 2010;
Foday Lion pickup
Foday Lion F16 pickup
Foday Lion F22 pickup
Foday Little Superman pickup

Product Gallery

References

External links
Foday Global website 
Brochure

Companies based in Foshan
Vehicle manufacturing companies established in 1988
Sport utility vehicles
Truck manufacturers of China
Chinese brands
Chinese companies established in 1988